35 Denton (formerly NX35 and 35 Conferette) was an annual 3-day music festival that took place in the burgeoning arts corridor of downtown Denton, Texas. The festival was programmed each March the week prior to the music portion of SXSW in Austin, Texas.

35 Denton was organized by a core staff of volunteers. The music festival has featured many nationally touring acts, such as Solange, The Pains of Being Pure At Heart, Local Natives, Portugal. The Man, The Flaming Lips, The Jesus and Mary Chain, The Mountain Goats, Bun B, Devin the Dude, Dr. Dog, Big Boi, Reggie Watts, The Civil Wars, Best Coast, Danny Brown, A Place to Bury Strangers, and more. Likewise, it also had a roster of notable local acts, such as Neon Indian, Midlake, Sarah Jaffe, Brave Combo, Riverboat Gamblers, Seryn, and more.

History
2005 – 2008: The Austin Years

During SXSW 2005, festival founder Chris Flemmons planted the seeds of 35 Denton in the soil of Big Red Sun, a floral design boutique in Austin. Thirteen Denton acts performed on a stage in the business's outdoor garden for an invite-only crowd of international journalists and industry types. The beer was free, the Tex-Mex was homemade, and the goal was uncomplicated: Show the world what Denton's all about. Flemmons called the event NX35: The Afternoon Party of the Other, Smaller, Music Town in Texas. In 2006, it took place at Club DeVille, and in 2007 and 2008, the party moved to Momo's. Some notable performers from the event's years in Austin include Centro-matic's Will Johnson, Midlake, Sarah Jaffe, and the Baptist Generals.

2009 – 2016: The Denton Years

In 2009, after four years in Austin, Flemmons and a small staff of volunteers brought the day party home and turned it into a multi-day festival. The goal of showcasing Denton's performers and people did not change, but the name did: NX35 Music Conferette, which opened with a keynote address led by American Splendor creator Harvey Pekar. Before the inaugural festival ended, more than 4000 people had watched over 120 acts play on the stages of Denton's numerous clubs and coffeeshops.

In 2010, more than 250 acts performed on and around Denton's downtown square – to an estimated audience of 20,000 people. The event began with keynote speaker Steve Albini and featured a now storied free Saturday night performance by the Flaming Lips and Denton's own Midlake at the North Texas Fairgrounds. Also instituted this year was daytime programming with speakers and panels addressing a broad range of topics concerning cultural planning, urban development, gender issues, tech entrepreneurship, and the music, art, and film industries. This programming emerged as one of the recurring highlights of the festival. Other notable performers from this era include Neon Indian, Centro-matic, HEALTH, The Black Angels, The Baptist Generals, Brave Combo, Sarah Jaffe, Monotonix, Riverboat Gamblers, Shiny Around the Edges, and True Widow.

In 2011, the festival changed its name to 35 Conferette. The name wasn't the only big change, as the fest expanded into the streets of downtown Denton with the addition of three outdoor stages, one of which was on the courthouse lawn. Performers included a growing roster of national talent like Big Boi, Mavis Staples, Dr. Dog, Reggie Watts, Japanther, and Damien Jurado. In the months that followed, 35 Conferette was named Best Promotional Event of 2011 by the Texas Downtown Association. Festival founder Chris Flemmons handed the event's future to a new leadership staff led by Creative Director Kyle La Valley and Programming Director, Natalie Dávila. The festival's name changed to 35 Denton in July 2011.

In 2012, 35 Denton was headlined by The Jesus and Mary Chain – though they performed a few days later than anticipated. After visa issues prevented their Saturday night appearance, the band played the following Wednesday at the North Texas Fairgrounds, with Ty Segall as an opening act. Other notable 2012 acts included Built to Spill, Bun B, The Raincoats, OM, Best Coast, Thee Oh Sees, and Dum Dum Girls.In 2013, 35 Denton featured performances by Solange, Sleep, Roky Erickson, Com Truise, Silver Apples, Killer Mike, Thee Oh Sees, Akron/Family, Man Man, Mikal Cronin, Mac DeMarco, Beach Fossils, Reigning Sound, Marnie Stern, Soul Clap, and the live Texas debut of Thurston Moore's side-project Chelsea Light Moving.

After 2013, La Valley and Dávila left the festival leadership and the organization's primary investors withdrew funding. The festival did not take place in 2014, opting instead to take a year off to reorganize and locate new investors. During this time, a new Denton music festival in Oaktopia was formed to run opposite 35 Denton in the fall of each year.

In 2015, 35 Denton returned under the theme "Back To The Music", and featured performances by the 1970s The Zombies, Jimmie Dale Gilmore, Cymbals Eat Guitars, Chastity Belt (band), Lowell (musician), S U R V I V E, and the reunion performance of Ten Hands (band) led by local musician Paul Slavens.

In 2016, was headlined by the soul artist Charles Bradley (singer) and his Extraordinaires, hip-hop throwback Biz Markie, and Eliot Sumner, the child of English rock musician Sting (musician). Other notable performances were by Electric Six, Fat Tony (rapper), Class Actress, Tacocat, Sheer Mag, Alesia Lani and the Mydolls.

The 2017 event was canceled without firm plans to revive the festival.

Evolution of a brand 
An interesting aspect of the festival is its evolving name and image. Each change reflected either a need to distinguish the festival from SXSW or of the evolving core staff crew that led the event.

Lineups By Year

2009 NX35 Conferette, March 12–15

2010 NX35 Conferette, March 11–14

2011 35 Conferette, March 10–13

2012 35 Denton, March 8–11

The Hot Wet Mess

In May 2012, 35 Denton announced a one-day end of summer party to take place on September 1, 2012 entitled 'The Hot Wet Mess.' The festival's first venture into event production outside the 35 Denton festival took place at the North Texas Fairgrounds and featured Black Lips, No Age, Reggie Watts, Big Freedia, Unknown Mortal Orchestra as well as local acts Fergus & Geronimo, DJ Sober and RTB2. The event was sponsored by Vitamin Water and Corona Light, and consisted of attractions such as a water slide to overlook the stage.

2013 35 Denton, March 7–10

2015 35 Denton, March 13–15

2016 35 Denton, March 13–15

See also
 Thin Line Fest
 Denton Arts and Jazz Festival
 Denton, Texas

Reference List

External links
Official website

Music festivals in Texas
Festivals in Denton, Texas
Music of Texas
Music conferences
Music of Denton, Texas
Rock festivals in the United States
Indie rock festivals